William A. Radford (1865–1943) was an American architect and publisher of numerous architectural and construction books via his Radford Architectural Company in Chicago, Illinois.

Biography

Early life 
Radford was born in Oshkosh, Wisconsin, in 1865, where he attended school and then joined the Radford Brothers Sash and Door Company, eventually in 1890 becoming the company secretary and treasurer.
He married and had two sons with Helen M. Manuel, and by 1899 was living in Riverside, Illinois.
He was a Mason and a Shriner.

Radford Architectural Company 
It was the Radford Architectural Company for which he is remembered, whose output over the years comprised more than 40 books on various types of construction and more than 1000 plans and specifications for buildings ranging from homes to small commercial buildings.
Radford founded this company in 1902, and his publications were collaborations with prominent authors in the field at the time including Frank E. Kidder, Alfred G. King, and Ira O. Baker.
He was also the founder of various magazines: Beautiful Homes, Farm Mechanics, American Carpenter and Builder, and Cement Homes.

Although, in the opinion of his biographer Neal Vogel, some of his designs were "lackluster versions" of Queen Anne or American Foursquare designs, some of his designs reflect the Prairie School aesthetic and his publications helped to spread it across the United States in the early 20th century.
Radford embraced what were then modern innovations, with books on construction types that were just coming into use such as his 1700-page-long 1910 Radford Cyclopedia of Cement Construction which dealt in the use of concrete and whose articles were written by a team of experts on the subject.

Retirement 
Radford retired to a ranch in Cupertino, California, at the onset of the Great Depression and died there in 1943.

Bibliography 

 
 
 
 

See also 
 Guldner House and Foster Ranch House — NRHP listed houses built to Radford plans; the Guldner House is #7082 in Radford's Artistic Homes (1908)

Notes

Sources

Further reading 

 
 
 
 

1865 births
1943 deaths
Architects from Wisconsin
People from Oshkosh, Wisconsin
American architecture writers
American encyclopedists